Hypostomus francisci is a species of catfish in the family Loricariidae. It is native to South America, where it occurs in the upper São Francisco River basin. The species reaches 36 cm (14.2 inches) SL.

References 

francisci
Fish described in 1874